The 1999 Seattle WTO protests, sometimes referred to as the Battle of Seattle, were a series of protests surrounding the WTO Ministerial Conference of 1999, when members of the World Trade Organization (WTO) convened at the Washington State Convention and Trade Center in Seattle, Washington on November 30, 1999. The Conference was to be the launch of a new millennial round of trade negotiations.

The negotiations were quickly overshadowed by massive street protests outside the hotels and the Washington State Convention and Trade Center. The protests were nicknamed "N30", akin to J18 and similar mobilizations, and were deemed controversial by the media. The large scale of the demonstrations, estimated at no fewer than 40,000 protesters, dwarfed any previous demonstration in the United States against a world meeting of any of the organizations generally associated with economic globalization, such as the WTO, the International Monetary Fund, and the World Bank.

Organizations and planning
Planning for the actions began months in advance and included local, national, and international organizations. Among the most notable participants were national and international nongovernmental organizations (NGOs) such as Global Exchange (especially those concerned with labor issues, the environment, and consumer protection), labor unions (including the AFL–CIO), student groups, religion-based groups (Jubilee 2000), and anarchists (some of whom formed a black bloc). The protests also drew support from some political conservatives, such as American presidential candidate and commentator Pat Buchanan.

The coalition was loose, with some opponent groups focused on opposition to WTO policies (especially those related to free trade), with others motivated by prolabor, anticapitalist, or environmental agendas.  Many of the NGOs represented at the protests came with credentials to participate in the official meetings, while also planning various educational and press events. The AFL–CIO, with cooperation from its member unions, organized a large permitted rally and march from Seattle Center to downtown.

However, others were more interested in taking direct action, including both civil disobedience and acts of vandalism and property destruction to disrupt the meeting. Several groups were loosely organized together under the Direct Action Network (DAN), with a plan to disrupt the meetings by blocking streets and intersections downtown to prevent delegates from reaching the convention center, where the meeting was to be held. The black bloc was not affiliated with DAN, but was responding to the original call for autonomous resistance actions on November 30 issued by People's Global Action.

Of the different coalitions that aligned in protest were the "teamsters and turtles" – a blue–green alliance consisting of the teamsters (trade unions) and environmentalists.

Corporations targeted
Certain activists, including locals and an additional group of anarchists from Eugene, Oregon (where they had gathered that summer for a music festival), advocated more confrontational tactics, and conducted vandalism of corporate properties in downtown Seattle. In a subsequent communique, they listed the particular corporations targeted, which they considered to have committed corporate crime.

Lead-up months
On July 12, the Financial Times reported that the latest United Nations Human Development report advocated "principles of performance for multinationals on labour standards, fair trade and environmental protection ... needed to counter the negative effects of globalisation on the poorest nations". The report itself argued, "An essential aspect of global governance is responsibility to people—to equity, to justice, to enlarging the choices of all".

On July 16, Helene Cooper of The Wall Street Journal warned of an impending "massive mobilization against globalization" being planned for the end-of-year Seattle WTO conference.  Next day, the London Independent newspaper savaged the WTO and appeared to side with the organizers of the rapidly developing storm of protest:

The way it has used [its] powers is leading to a growing suspicion that its initials should really stand for World Take Over. In a series of rulings it has struck down measures to help the world's poor, protect the environment, and safeguard health in the interests of private—usually American—companies.

"The WTO seems to be on a crusade to increase private profit at the expense of all other considerations, including the well-being and quality of life of the mass of the world's people," says Ronnie Hall, trade campaigner at Friends of the Earth International. "It seems to have a relentless drive to extend its power."

On November 16, two weeks before the conference, President Bill Clinton issued Executive Order 13141—Environmental Review of Trade Agreements, which committed the United States to a policy of "assessment and consideration of the environmental impacts of trade agreements" and stated, "Trade agreements should contribute to the broader goal of sustainable development."

Activists staged a spoof of Seattle daily newspaper the Post-Intelligencer on Wednesday November 24, inserting thousands of hoax editions of a four-page front-page wrap-around into piles of newspapers awaiting distribution to hundreds of street boxes and retail outlets. The spoof front-page stories were "Boeing to move overseas" (to Indonesia) and "Clinton pledges help for poorest nations". The byline on the Boeing story attributed it to Joe Hill (a union organizer who had been executed by firing squad in Utah in 1915). On the same day, the International Centre for Trade and Sustainable Development reported:

developing countries have remained steadfast in their demand that developed countries honour Uruguay Round commitments before moving forward full force with new trade negotiations.

Specifically, developing countries are concerned over developed countries' compliance with agreements on market access for textiles, their use of antidumping measures against developing countries' exports, and over-implementation of the WTO Agreement on Trade Related Aspects of Intellectual Property Rights (TRIPs).

N30

On the morning of Tuesday, November 30, 1999, the DAN's plan was put into effect. Several hundred activists arrived in the deserted streets near the convention center and began to take control of key intersections. Over the next few hours, a number of marchers began to converge on the area from different directions. These included a student march from the north, a march of citizens of the developing world who marched in from the south and, beginning around 09:00, militant anarchists (in a formation known as a black bloc) marching down Pike Street from 6th Avenue, blockading the streets with newspaper boxes and smashing windows. Some demonstrators held rallies, others held teach-ins and at least one group staged an early-morning street party. Meanwhile, a number of protesters still controlled the intersections using lockdown formations.

That morning, the King County Sheriff's Office and Seattle Police Department fired pepper spray, tear gas canisters, and stun grenades at protesters at several intersections in an attempt to reopen the blocked streets and allow as many WTO delegates as possible through the blockade.  At 6th Avenue and Union Street, the crowd threw objects back at the police.

By late morning, the black bloc had swelled to 200 people and smashed dozens of shops and police cars. This seems to have set off a chain reaction of sorts, with previously nonviolent protesters throwing bottles at police and joining in the vandalism shortly before noon.

The police were eventually overwhelmed by the mass of protesters downtown, including many who had chained themselves together and were blocking intersections. Meanwhile, the late-morning labor-organized rally and march drew tens of thousands; though the intended march route had them turning back before they reached the convention center, some ignored the marshals and joined what had become a chaotic scene downtown.

At noon, the opening ceremony at the convention center was officially canceled.  It took police much of the afternoon and evening to clear the streets. Seattle mayor Paul Schell declared a state of emergency, imposed a curfew, and a 50-block "no-protest zone."

December 1 

Overnight, the governor of Washington, Gary Locke, called in two battalions of Army National Guardsmen, other law enforcement agencies sent support, and before daylight on Wednesday, troops and officers lined the perimeter of the no-protest zone. Police surrounded and arrested several groups of would-be protesters (and more than one bystander).  Beginning at 21:00, a major clash took place on Broadway in the vicinity of Denny Way, involving rocks, bottles, and police concussion grenades.  It did not involve a black bloc, but appears to have included local residents, although it is known that many local residents were treated as protesters, even being teargassed, despite having no part in the protests. Police called in from other cities mistook the typically crowded streets of Capitol Hill as groups of protesters. More than 500 people were jailed on Wednesday. Throughout the day, police used tear gas to disperse crowds downtown, although a permitted demonstration organized by the Steelworkers Union was held along the waterfront.

December 2–3 

Protests continued the following days. Thousands demonstrated outside the Seattle Police Department protesting their tactics and arrests of peaceful protestors. President Clinton arrived and attended the conference. On December 3 the conference ended as delegations were unable to reach agreements, partly in response to the protests.
Confrontations with the police continued, albeit at a lower intensity. The primary goal of disrupting the trade talks achieved, some sought the horizons of possibility; it was determined quickly that the necessary ambition to achieve the broader goals of various anarchist factions was not sufficient.

Media response 
The New York Times printed an erroneous article that stated that protesters at the 1999 WTO convention in Seattle threw Molotov cocktails at police. Two days later, The New York Times printed a correction saying that the protest was mostly peaceful and no protesters were accused of throwing objects at delegates or the police, but the original error persisted in later accounts in the mainstream media.

The Seattle City Council also dispelled these rumors with its own investigation findings:
The level of panic among police is evident from radio communication and from their inflated crowd estimates, which exceed the numbers shown on news videotapes. ARC investigators found the rumors of "Molotov cocktails" and sale of flammables from a supermarket had no basis in fact. But, rumors were important in contributing to the police sense of being besieged and in considerable danger.

An article in the magazine The Nation disputed that Molotov cocktails have ever been thrown at an antiglobalization protest within the US. 

Though media coverage of the Battle in Seattle condemned the violence of some of the protesters, the nature of this violence has been justified by some people. Specifically, the violence employed was not person-to-person violence, but "acts directed toward property, not people."
Though many still denounced the violent tactics used by protesters of the 1999 WTO meeting in Seattle,  this violence clearly resulted in increased media coverage of the event. The WTO meeting had an increase in evening news airtime from 10 minutes and 40 seconds on the first day of the meeting to 17 minutes on the first day of violence. In addition, WTO coverage was the lead or second story on CNN, ABC, CBS, and NBC after violence was reported. Two days after the start of violence, the meeting remained the top story on three of the four networks. Though these numbers alone are telling, the media coverage of subsequent demonstrations that did not include violence by protesters shows even more the effect of violence on coverage. For example, the World Bank/International Monetary Fund (WB/IMF) meetings in the spring showed a "coverage pattern that was almost the reverse of that in Seattle" and that "suggests the crucial role of violence in garnering time on the public screen." In an even more striking example of the effects of violence on media coverage, the 2001 WTO meeting in Doha, Qatar, included no reports of violence. As a result, "there was absolutely no TV evening news coverage by the four major networks."

This coverage did not center exclusively on the violence. Instead, details of the protesters' message and antiglobalization campaign were included along with the discussions of symbolic violence taking place. DeLuca believes the violence served as a dense surface that opened viewers' and readers' minds to a whole new way of thinking about globalization and corporations' operations. That is, not only was this violence contained within the familiar setting of television, and not only did it meet the criteria of being dramatic and emotional enough to warrant air time, but it also shattered preconceived notions of globalization and the practices of corporations that drive so much of America's economy.

Aftermath
To many in North American anarchist and radical circles, the Seattle WTO riots, protests, and demonstrations were viewed as a success.  Prior to the "Battle of Seattle", almost no mention was made of "antiglobalization" in the US media, while the protests were seen as having forced the media to report on 'why' anybody would oppose the WTO.

Previous mass demonstrations had taken place in Australia in December 1997, in which newly formed grass-roots organizations blockaded Melbourne, Perth, Sydney, and Darwin city centers.

Controversy over the city's response to the protests resulted in the resignation of the police chief of Seattle, Norm Stamper, and arguably played a role in Schell's loss to Greg Nickels in the 2001 mayoral primary election. The massive size of the protest added $3 million to the city's estimated meeting budget of $6 million, partly due to city cleanup and police overtime bills. In addition, the damage to commercial businesses from vandalism and lost sales has been estimated at $20 million.

On January 16, 2004, the city of Seattle settled with 157 individuals arrested outside of the no-protest zone during the WTO events, agreeing to pay them a total of $250,000. On January 30, 2007, a federal jury found that the city had violated protesters' Fourth Amendment constitutional rights by arresting them without probable cause or evidence.

See also
 1988 IMF/World Bank protests, anti-globalization precursor protest a decade earlier in West Berlin
 27th G8 summit, a 2001 summit that resulted in anti-globalization protests and similar controversies about police and government response
 Battle in Seattle, a 2007 film loosely based on the protests.
 Electrohippies, an international group of internet activists involved in action against the WTO
 List of incidents of civil unrest in the United States
 Multilateral Agreement on Investment, a draft agreement that failed in 1998 due to 
 Showdown in Seattle, a 1999 documentary film about the protests
 30 Frames a Second: The WTO in Seattle 2000, a 2000 documentary shot during the protests
 Via Campesina, an international movement of peasants' organizations

References

Bibliography

Further reading

External links

 University of Washington WTO History Project, interviews and documentation of the protest
 Raw video footage of the protests, organized by day and street intersection
 Storming Seattle by Paul De Armond, an account of the protest in multiple parts
The World Trade Organization 1999 Seattle Ministerial Conference Protest collection, 1993–2011. 45.63 cubic feet. At the Labor Archives of Washington, University of Washington Libraries Special Collections. Also see digital collections.

1999 protests
1999 riots
1999 in Washington (state)
Anti-globalization protests
Anti-capitalism
1999 in Seattle
Protests in Seattle
World Trade Organization
Anarchism in the United States
Communism in the United States
Socialism in the United States
Riots and civil disorder in Washington (state)
November 1999 events in the United States
December 1999 events in the United States
Political riots in the United States